Bill Rock is a rock which lies  east of the south end of Grass Island in Stromness Bay, South Georgia. It was charted and named in 1928 by Discovery Investigations personnel.

References 

Rock formations of Antarctica